SCCA ProRally was an American rally racing series, run by the Sports Car Club of America from 1973 until 2004. The SCCA discontinued it for 2005, due to concerns about safety and insurance. It allowed Rally America to replace it, utilizing most of the same venues and existing infrastructure.

Rallies

Rallies which were included on the SCCA ProRally calendar include:
 Rally in the 100 Acre Wood 1977–1983, 2002
 Big Bend Bash 1973–1976, 1978–1982, 1992
 Cherokee Trails Rally 2001, 2002
 Chisum Trail PRO Rally 1976 (Unofficial) 1978–1982
 Doo Wops III/IV Rally 1994–1999
 Happiness Is Sunrise Rally 1974-1975, 1979–1980
 Lake Superior Rally 1994–2004
 Maine Forest Rally, Summer 1994–2004, Winter 1991–1997, 2002
 Mojave 24 Hours Rally 1974-1977
 Nor'Wester Rally 1973–1978, 1981–1986
 Ojibwe Forests Rally 1986–2004
 Olympus Rally 1973–1975, 1980–1987
 Oregon Trail Rally 1984, 2000–2004
 Pikes Peak Hillclimb 2002–2004
 Prescott Forest Rally 1992–2001
 Press-on-Regardless Rally 1975, 1977–1993
 Rim of the World 1989–2004
 Sand Hills Sandblast Rally 1994–1996
 Sno*Drift 1973–1975, 1980, 1981, 1983, 1997–2004
 Sunriser 400 Forest Rally 1973–1975, 1977–1979, 1981, 1984–1985, 1987–1990, 1994–1996
 Susquehannock Trail Performance Rally 1977–2004
 Wild West Rally 1985, 1987–1988, 1993–1994, 1996–2003

NOTE: The series was given the name "SCCA Pro Rally Series" in 1972.  This name was used until 1998.  In 1999 SCCA trademarked the term "ProRally," which was used thereafter.

Champions
Championships were awarded to drivers and co-drivers based on finishes in several classes.  An overall champion, based on overall finishes was also awarded.  From 1998 until 2004 a separate championship was awarded to the best-placed 2 wheel drive team, regardless of class.

References

Rally racing series
Auto racing series in the United States
Pro Rally